Maryland Route 578 (MD 578) is a state highway in the U.S. state of Maryland.  Known as Bethlehem Road, the state highway runs  from MD 331 at Bethlehem east to MD 16 at Harmony.  The first segment of MD 578 was completed in the mid-1930s; the remainder was built in the early 1940s.

Route description

MD 578 begins at an intersection with MD 331 (Dover Bridge Road) in Bethlehem.  Bethlehem Road continues south as a county highway.  MD 578 heads northeast as a two-lane undivided road through farmland.  After passing Newton Road, the state highway crosses Hog Creek.  MD 578 meets its eastern terminus at MD 16 (Harmony Road) in the unincorporated village of Harmony.

History
MD 578 was paved by 1935 from Bethlehem to Newton Road.  The remainder of the highway to Harmony, including the bridge over Hog Creek, was completed in 1941.

Junction list

See also

References

External links

MDRoads: MD 578

578
Maryland Route 578